North American moths represent about 12,000 types of moths. In comparison, there are about 825 species of North American butterflies. The moths (mostly nocturnal) and butterflies (mostly diurnal) together make up the taxonomic order Lepidoptera.

This list is sorted by MONA number (MONA is short for Moths of America North of Mexico). A numbering system for North American moths introduced by Ronald W. Hodges et al. in 1983 in the publication Check List of the Lepidoptera of America North of Mexico. The list has since been updated, but the placement in families is outdated for some species.

This list covers America north of Mexico (effectively the continental United States and Canada). For a list of moths and butterflies recorded from the state of Hawaii, see List of Lepidoptera of Hawaii.

This is a partial list, covering moths with MONA numbers ranging from 855 to 2311. For the rest of the list, see List of moths of North America.

Oecophoridae
0855 – Agonopterix gelidella 
0856 – Agonopterix hyperella 
0857 – Agonopterix lythrella 
0858 – Agonopterix nubiferella 
0859 – Agonopterix curvilineella, curved-line agonopterix moth
0860 – Agonopterix muricolorella 
0861 – Agonopterix oregonensis 
0862 – Agonopterix clemensella 
0863 – Agonopterix clarkei 
0864 – Agonopterix atrodorsella 
0865 – Agonopterix pteleae 
0866 – Agonopterix eupatoriiella 
0867 – Agonopterix pulvipennella 
0868 – Agonopterix nigrinotella 
0868.1 – Agonopterix costimacula 
0868.2 – Agonopterix paulae 
0869 – Agonopterix walsinghamella, Walsingham's agonopterix moth
0870 – Agonopterix fusciterminella 
0871 – Agonopterix chrautis 
0872 – Agonopterix sabulella 
0873 – Agonopterix dammersi 
0874 – Agonopterix cajonensis 
0874.1 – Agonopterix alstroemeriana, poison hemlock moth
0875 – Agonopterix toega 
0876 – Agonopterix rosaciliella 
0877 – Agonopterix ciliella 
0878 – Agonopterix canadensis, Canadian agonopterix moth
0879 – Agonopterix arnicella 
0880 – Agonopterix flavicomella 
0881 – Agonopterix senicionella 
0882 – Agonopterix robiniella, four-dotted agonopterix moth
0883 – Agonopterix cratia 
0884 – Agonopterix thelmae, Thelma's agonopterix moth
0885 – Agonopterix sanguinella 
0886 – Agonopterix lecontella 
0887 – Agonopterix dimorphella 
0888 – Agonopterix pergandeella 
0889 – Agonopterix argillacea 
0890 – Agonopterix amissella 
0891 – Agonopterix psoraliella 
0892 – Agonopterix hesphoea 
0893 – Agonopterix antennariella 
0894 – Agonopterix nebulosa 
0895 – Agonopterix nervosa, gorse tip moth
0896 – Agonopterix posticella 
0897 – Agonopterix latipalpella 
0898 – Agonopterix amyrisella 
0899 – Depressariodes canella 
0900 – Depressariodes umbraticostella 
0901 – Depressariodes sordidella 
0902 – Depressariodes gracilis 
0903 – Depressariodes thoracenigraeella 
0904 – Depressariodes thoracefasciella 
0905 – Depressariodes nechlys 
0906 – Depressariodes nivalis 
0907 – Depressariodes hildaella 
0908 – Depressariodes ciniflonella 
0909 – Depressariodes scabella 
0910 – Depressariodes fulva 
0911 – Bibarrambla allenella, bog bibarrambla moth
0912 – Semioscopis packardella, Packard's concealer moth
0913 – Semioscopis merriccella 
0914 – Semioscopis inornata 
0915 – Semioscopis megamicrella 
0916 – Semioscopis aurorella 
0917 – Semioscopis mcdunnoughi 
0918 – Depressaria atrostrigella 
0919 – Depressaria artemisiae 
0920 – Depressaria palousella 
0921 – Depressaria cinereocostella 
0922 – Depressaria pastinacella, parsnip webworm moth
0923 – Depressaria juliella 
0924 – Depressaria daucella 
0924.1 – Depressaria depressana, purple carrot-seed moth
0925 – Depressaria eleanorae 
0926 – Depressaria alienella 
0927 – Depressaria artemisiella 
0928 – Depressaria constancei 
0929 – Depressaria betina 
0930 – Depressaria whitmani 
0931 – Depressaria schellbachi 
0932 – Depressaria angelicivora 
0933 – Depressaria leptotaeniae 
0934 – Depressaria yakimae 
0935 – Depressaria multifidae 
0936 – Depressaria moya 
0937 – Depressaria besma 
0938 – Depressaria pteryxiphaga 
0939 – Depressaria togata 
0940 – Depressaria armata 
0941 – Depressaria angustati 
0942 – Nites grotella, hazel leaftier moth
0943 – Nites atrocapitella 
0944 – Nites betulella, black-dotted birch leaftier moth
0945 – Nites maculatella 
0946 – Nites ostryella 
0947 – Apachea barberella 
0948 – Himmacia huachucella 
0949 – Himmacia stratia 
0950 – Himmacia diligenda 
0951 – Machimia tentoriferella, gold-striped leaftier moth
0952 – Machimia trigama 
0953 – Eupragia hospita 
0954 – Eupragia banis 
0955 – Psilocorsis quercicella, oak leaftier moth
0956 – Psilocorsis cryptolechiella, black-fringed leaftier moth
0957 – Psilocorsis reflexella, dotted leaftier moth
0958 – Psilocorsis amydra 
0959 – Psilocorsis arguta 
0959.1 – Psilocorsis fatula 
0960 – Psilocorsis cirrhoptera 
0961 – Pyramidobela quinquecristata 
0961.1 – Pyramidobela angelarum, buddleia budworm moth
0961.2 – Pyramidobela agyrtodes 
0962 – Ethmia umbrimarginella 
0963 – Ethmia lassenella 
0964 – Ethmia coquillettella 
0965 – Ethmia monachella 
0966 – Ethmia scylla 
0967 – Ethmia brevistriga 
0968 – Ethmia albitogata 
0969 – Ethmia plagiobothrae 
0970 – Ethmia minuta 
0971 – Ethmia tricula 
0972 – Ethmia charybdis 
0973 – Ethmia albistrigella 
0974 – Ethmia nadia 
0975 – Ethmia orestella 
0976 – Ethmia semilugens 
0977 – Ethmia epileuca 
0978 – Ethmia apicipunctella 
0979 – Ethmia arctostaphylella 
0980 W – Ethmia discostrigella, mountain-mahogany moth
0981 – Ethmia semitenebrella 
0982 – Ethmia macelhosiella 
0983 – Ethmia geranella 
0984 – Ethmia timberlakei 
0985 – Ethmia macneilli 
0986 – Ethmia bipunctella, viper's bugloss moth
0987 – Ethmia monticola, gray ethmia moth
0988 – Ethmia caliginosella 
0989 – Ethmia hagenella 
0990 – Ethmia mimihagenella 
0991 – Ethmia burnsella 
0992 – Ethmia zelleriella, Zeller's ethmia moth
0993 – Ethmia delliella, ladder-backed ethmia moth
0994 – Ethmia bittenella 
0994.1 – Ethmia abraxasella 
0994.2 – Ethmia submissa 
0994.3 – Ethmia subsimilis 
0995 – Ethmia notatella 
0996 – Ethmia confusella 
0997 – Ethmia julia 
0998 – Ethmia farrella 
0998.1 – Ethmia powelli 
0999 – Ethmia longimaculella, streaked ethmia moth
0999.1 – Ethmia kutisi 
1000 – Ethmia semiombra 
1001 – Ethmia albicostella 
1002 – Ethmia mirusella 
1003 – Ethmia trifurcella 
1004 – Ethmia marmorea 
1005 – Ethmia hodgesella 
1006 – Ethmia sphenisca 
1007 – Ethmia prattiella 
1007.1 – Ethmia angustalatella 
1008 – Pseudethmia protuberans 
1009 – Pseuderotis obiterella 
1010 – Durrantia piperatella 
1010.1 – Autosticha kyotensis, Kyoto moth
1011 – Antaeotricha schlaegeri, Schlaeger's fruitworm moth
1012 – Antaeotricha lindseyi 
1013 – Antaeotricha unipunctella 
1014 – Antaeotricha leucillana, pale gray bird-dropping moth
1015 – Antaeotricha osseella 
1016 – Antaeotricha decorosella 
1017 – Antaeotricha furcata 
1018 – Antaeotricha irene 
1019 – Antaeotricha humilis, dotted anteotricha moth
1020 – Antaeotricha agriochista 
1021 – Antaeotricha thomasi 
1022 – Antaeotricha haesitans 
1023 – Antaeotricha fuscorectangulata 
1024 – Antaeotricha vestalis, Vestal moth
1025 – Antaeotricha manzanitae 
1025.1 – Antaeotricha arizonensis, Ferris's antaeotricha moth
1026 – Rectiostoma xanthobasis, yellow-vested moth
1027 – Rectiostoma fernaldella 
1028 – Menestomorpha oblongata 
1029 – Menestomorpha kimballi 
1030 – Menesta tortriciformella 
1031 – Menesta melanella 
1031.1 – Chlamydastis habrolepis 
1032 – Gonioterma mistrella 
1033 – Gonioterma crambitella 
1034 – Inga sparsiciliella, black-marked inga moth
1035 – Inga cretacea, chalky inga moth
1036 – Inga ciliella 
1037 – Inga obscuromaculella 
1038 – Inga canariella 
1039 – Inga concolorella 
1040 – Inga proditrix 
1041 – Inga rimatrix 
1042 – Decantha boreasella, reticulated decantha moth
1043 – Decantha stecia 
1044 – Decantha tistra 
1045 – Decantha stonda 
1046 – Epicallima argenticinctella, orange-headed epicallima moth
1047 – Epicallima nathrax 
1047.1 – Promalactis suzukiella, Suzuki's promalactis moth
1048 – Dafa formosella, beautiful epicallima moth
1049 – Batia lunaris, batia moth
1050 – Fabiola shaleriella, Shaler's fabiola moth
1051 – Fabiola tecta 
1052 – Fabiola lucidella 
1053 – Fabiola edithella, Edith's fabiola moth
1054 – Fabiola quinqueferella 
1055 – Brymblia quadrimaculella 
1056 – Denisia haydenella 
1057 – Esperia sulphurella, sulphur esperia moth
1058 – Polix coloradella, the skunk moth
1059 – Mathildana newmanella, Newman's mathildana moth
1060 – Mathildana flipria 
1061 – Borkhausenia nefrax 
1062 – Carolana ascriptella 
1063 – Carolana golmeia 
1064 – Hofmannophila pseudospretella, brown house moth
1065 – Martyringa latipennis 
1066 – Martyringa xeraula, Himalayan grain moth
1067 – Endrosis sarcitrella, white-shouldered house moth
1068 – Eido trimaculella 
1069 – Carcina quercana, oak skeletonizer moth
1069.1 – Oecophora bractella 
1070 – Stathmopoda elyella 
1070.1 – Stathmopoda aenea 
1071 – Stathmopoda pedella 
1072 – Idioglossa miraculosa 
1073 – Cyphacma tragiae 
1074 – Pleurota albastrigulella 
1075 – Cheimophila salicella, blueberry flagleaf webworm moth

Elachistidae
1076 – Coelopoeta glutinosi 
1076.1 – Coelopoeta phaceliae 
1076.2 – Coelopoeta maiadella 
1077 – Perittia cygnodiella 
1077.1 – Perittia herrichiella 
1077.2 – Perittia passula 
1077.3 – Mendesia serica 
1077.4 – Mendesia metaxea 
1077.5 – Perittia clarkei 
1078 – Annettenia eremonoma 
1079 – Stephensia cunilae 
1080 – Elachista dasycara 
1081 – Elachista epimicta 
1081.1 – Elachista perniva 
1082 – Elachista symmorpha 
1083 – Elachista orestella 
1084 – Elachista synopla 
1084.1 – Elachista ischnella 
1084.2 – Elachista nubila 
1084.3 – Elachista anagna 
1084.4 – Elachista triangulifera 
1085 – Elachista spatiosa 
1086 – Elachista aurocristata 
1087 – Elachista controversa 
1088 – Elachista virgatula 
1088.1 – Elachista inopina 
1088.2 – Elachista conidia 
1088.3 – Elachista lurida 
1088.4 – Elachista thelma 
1088.5 – Elachista louisella 
1088.6 – Elachista dagnirella 
1088.7 – Elachista aerinella 
1089 – Elachista adempta 
1089.1 – Elachista scobifera 
1089.2 – Elachista apina 
1089.3 – Elachista achrantella 
1090 – Elachista griseicornis 
1090.1 – Elachista adianta 
1090.2 – Elachista nucula 
1091 – Elachista acenteta 
1091.1 – Elachista aphyodes 
1092 – Elachista hololeuca 
1094 – Elachista lamina 
1094.1 – Elachista sabulella 
1094.2 – Elachista granosa 
1095 – Elachista sincera 
1096 – Elachista parvipulvella 
1097 – Elachista coniophora 
1097.1 – Elachista argillacea 
1098 – Elachista hiberna 
1098.1 – Elachista subalbidella 
1099 – Elachista patriodoxa 
1099.1 – Elachista lomionella 
1099.2 – Elachista dissona 
1099.3 – Elachista arena 
1099.4 – Elachista ossuaria 
1099.5 – Elachista aspila 
1099.6 – Elachista loriella 
1100 – Elachista irrorata 
1100.1 – Elachista olorinella 
1101 – Elachista fuliginea 
1101.1 – Elachista kilmunella 
1102 – Elachista alpinella 
1103 – Elachista pusilla 
1105 – Elachista maculoscella 
1106 – Elachista excelsicola 
1106.1 – Elachista zernyi 
1107 – Elachista stramineola 
1107.1 – Elachista morwenella 
1107.2 – Elachista marachella 
1107.3 – Elachista telcharella 
1107.4 – Elachista finarfinella 
1107.5 – Elachista indisella 
1107.6 – Elachista gildorella 
1107.7 – Elachista tauronella 
1108 – Elachista leucofrons 
1109 – Elachista albicapitella 
1109.1 – Elachista haldarella 
1110 – Elachista sylvestris 
1112 – Elachista texanica 
1113 – Elachista maritimella 
1113.1 – Elachista curufinella 
1113.2 – Elachista ragnorella 
1113.3 – Elachista gorlimella 
1114 – Elachista staintonella 
1114.1 – Elachista maglorella 
1114.2 – Elachista bregorella 
1114.3 – Elachista caranthirella 
1114.4 – Elachista turgonella 
1115 – Elachista cana 
1115.1 – Elachista arthadella 
1115.2 – Elachista telerella 
1115.3 – Elachista dolabella 
1115.4 – Elachista cicadella 
1116 – Elachista amideta 
1116.1 – Elachista celegormella 
1116.2 – Elachista daeronella 
1116.3 – Elachista aredhella 
1116.4 – Elachista amrodella 
1116.5 – Elachista diorella 
1117 – Elachista inaudita 
1118 – Elachista praelineata 
1118.1 – Elachista ibunella 
1118.2 – Elachista aristoteliella 
1118.3 – Elachista eilinella 
1118.4 – Elachista guilinella 
1118.5 – Elachista turinella 
1118.6 – Elachista nienorella 
1118.7 – Elachista aranella 
1118.8 – Elachista miriella 
1118.9 – Elachista serindella 
1119 – Elachista solitaria 
1120 – Elachista radiantella 
1121 – Elachista madarella 
1122 – Elachista enitescens 
1123 – Elachista argentosa 
1123.1 – Elachista glenni 
1123.2 – Elachista diederichsiella 
1124 – Elachista cucullata 
1124.1 – Elachista calusella 
1125 – Elachista agilis 
1126 – Elachista leucosticta 
1126.1 – Elachista absaroka 
1127 – Elachista albidella 
1128 – Elachista salinaris 
1128.1 – Elachista eleochariella 
1128.2 – Elachista beothucella 
1128.3 – Elachista cerasella 
1128.4 – Elachista huron 
1128.5 – Elachista serra 
1128.6 – Elachista vinlandica 
1128.7 – Elachista ciliigera 
1128.8 – Elachista lenape 
1128.9 – Elachista pelaena 
1129 – Elachista illectella 
1129.1 – Elachista beorella 
1130 – Elachista herbigrada 
1130.1 – Elachista neithanella 
1130.2 – Elachista tuorella 
1130.3 – Elachista galadella 
1130.4 – Elachista rianella 
1130.5 – Elachista pyrrha 
1131 – Elachista scopulicola 
1132 – Elachista brachyelythrifoliella 
1132.1 – Elachista saccharella, sugarcane leafminer moth
1132.2 – Elachista dulcinella 
1132.3 – Elachista suavella 
1132.4 – Elachista helodella 
1132.5 – Elachista angularis 
1132.6 – Elachista uniolae 
1132.7 – Elachista hedionella 
1132.8 – Elachista freyerella

Symmocidae
1133 – Symmoca signatella 
1134 – Oegoconia quadripuncta, four-spotted yellowneck moth
1134.1 – Spinitibia hodgesi 
1135 – Sceptea aequepulvella

Glyphidoceridae
1136 – Glyphidocera barythyma 
1136.1 – Glyphidocera juniperella, juniper tip moth
1137 – Glyphidocera democratica 
1138 – Glyphidocera floridanella 
1138.1 – Glyphidocera hurlberti 
1139 – Glyphidocera lactiflosella, five-spotted glyphidocera moth
1140 – Glyphidocera lithodoxa 
1141 – Glyphidocera meyrickella 
1142 – Glyphidocera septentrionella 
1142.1 – Glyphidocera wrightorum 
1143 – Glyphidocera dimorphella

Autostichidae
1144 – Gerdana caritella

Blastobasidae
1148 – Holcocera guilandinae 
1149 – Hypatopa hulstella 
1150.1 – Blastobasis ochrobathra 
1151 – Asaphocrita plummerella 
1151.1 – Hypatopa simplicella 
1152 – Hypatopa sagitella 
1153 – Blastobasis segnella 
1154 – Blastobasis yuccaecolella 
1156 – Hypatopa titanella 
1158 – Holcocera coccivorella, scale-feeding scavenger moth
1159 – Blastobasis confectella 
1160 – Blastobasis floridella 
1162 – Blastobasis glandulella, acorn moth
1163 – Blastobasis nothrotes 
1164 – Blastobasis quaintancella 
1165 – Blastobasis repartella 
1166 – Blastobasis retectella 
1167 – Blastobasis pulchella 
1168 – Calosima argyrosplendella 
1169 – Calosima dianella, eastern pine catkin borer moth
1169.1 – Calosima lucidella 
1169.2 – Calosima lepidophaga 
1170 – Asaphocrita protypica 
1171 – Asaphocrita aphidiella 
1173 – Hypatopa boreasella 
1173.1 – Hypatopa annulipes 
1174 – Asaphocrita busckiella 
1175 – Holcocera chalcofrontella 
1177 – Blastobasis confamulella 
1178 – Holcocera crassicornella 
1179 – Hypatopa crescentella 
1181 – Calosima elyella 
1181.1 – Calosima munroei
1182 – Asaphocrita estriatella 
1182.1 – Asaphocrita fuscopurpurella 
1183 – Hypatopa fluxella 
1184 – Hypatopa funebra 
1185 – Holcocera gigantella 
1187 – Holcocera iceryaeella 
1188 – Hypatopa illibella 
1190 – Hypatopa inconspicua 
1191 – Hypatopa insulatella 
1192 – Hypatopa interpunctella 
1193 – Asaphocrita irenica 
1197 – Calosima melanostriatella 
1198 – Hypatopa messelinella 
1200 – Hypatopa morrisoni 
1202 – Hypatopa nigrostriata 
1203 – Hypatopa nucella 
1205 – Holcocera panurgella 
1206 – Holcocera paradoxa 
1206.1 – Holcocera villella 
1207 – Asaphocrita plagiatella 
1208 – Hypatopa punctiferella 
1212 – Asaphocrita sciaphilella 
1213 – Hypatopa texanella 
1214 – Hypatopa spretella 
1217 – Hypatopa ursella 
1218 – Hypatopa vestaliella 
1221 – Holcocera immaculella 
1224 – Holcocera anomalella 
1225 – Holcocera gargantuella
1225.1 – Holcocera concolor
1227 – Pigritia fidella 
1229 – Pigritia arizonella 
1232 – Pigritia laticapitella 
1237 – Hypatopa spoliatella 
1239 – Pigritia ochrocomella 
1239.1 – Mastema occidentalis 
1239.2 – Pterolonche inspersa 
1246 – Pigritia murtfeldtella

Coleophoridae and Batrachedridae
1254 – Coleophora malivorella, pistol casebearer moth
1255 – Coleophora sacramenta 
1256 – Coleophora tiliaefoliella 
1257 – Coleophora atromarginata, American pistol casebearer moth
1258 – Coleophora albovanescens 
1259 – Coleophora discostriata 
1260 – Coleophora elaeagnisella, speckled casebearer moth
1261 – Coleophora querciella 
1262 – Coleophora rosaefoliella 
1263 – Coleophora laurentella 
1264 – Coleophora vancouverensis 
1265 – Coleophora annulicola 
1266 – Coleophora asterophagella 
1267 – Coleophora wyethiae 
1268 – Coleophora monardella 
1269 – Coleophora vernoniaeella 
1270 – Coleophora argentella 
1271 – Coleophora pruniella, cherry casebearer moth
1272 – Coleophora leucochrysella 
1273 – Coleophora kalmiella 
1274 – Coleophora canadensisella 
1275 – Coleophora salicivorella 
1276 – Coleophora gaylussaciella 
1277 – Coleophora cornivorella 
1278 – Coleophora viburniella 
1279 – Coleophora affiliatella 
1280 – Coleophora multicristatella 
1281 – Coleophora dissociella 
1282 – Coleophora vacciniivorella 
1283 – Coleophora cretaticostella 
1284 – Coleophora murinella 
1285 – Coleophora rupestrella 
1286 – Coleophora ledi 
1287 – Coleophora persimplexella 
1288 – Coleophora manitoba 
1289 – Coleophora accordella 
1289.1 – Coleophora colutella 
1290 – Coleophora kearfottella 
1291 – Coleophora laticornella, pecan cigar casebearer moth
1292 – Coleophora corylifoliella 
1293 – Coleophora juglandella 
1294 – Coleophora lentella 
1295 – Coleophora ostryae 
1296 – Coleophora alniella 
1297 – Coleophora cornella 
1298 – Coleophora alnifoliae 
1299 – Coleophora umbratica 
1300 – Coleophora comptoniella, birch casebearer moth
1301 – Coleophora ulmifoliella, elm casebearer moth
1301.1 – Coleophora limosipennella 
1301.2 – Coleophora badiipennella 
1302 – Coleophora granifera 
1303 – Coleophora astericola 
1304 – Coleophora paludoides 
1305 – Coleophora glaucella 
1306 – Coleophora polemoniella 
1307 – Coleophora cerasivorella 
1308 – Coleophora serratella, cigar casebearer moth
1309 – Coleophora irroratella 
1310 – Coleophora demissella 
1311 – Coleophora laricella, larch casebearer moth
1312 – Coleophora asterosella 
1313 – Coleophora rosaevorella 
1314 – Coleophora acutipennella 
1315 – Coleophora bistrigella 
1316 – Coleophora rosacella 
1317 – Coleophora viscidiflorella 
1318 – Coleophora heinrichella 
1319 – Coleophora monardae 
1320 – Coleophora lynosyridella 
1321 – Coleophora mcdunnoughiella 
1322 – Coleophora entoloma 
1323 – Coleophora sparsipuncta 
1324 – Coleophora crinita 
1325 – Coleophora seminella 
1326 – Coleophora atriplicivora 
1327 – Coleophora suaedae 
1328 – Coleophora acamtopappi 
1329 – Coleophora quadristrigella 
1330 – Coleophora simulans 
1331 – Coleophora versurella 
1332 – Coleophora ericoides 
1333 – Coleophora subapicis 
1334 – Coleophora triplicis 
1335 – Coleophora puberuloides 
1336 – Coleophora texanella 
1337 – Coleophora duplicis 
1338 – Coleophora rugosae 
1339 – Coleophora acuminatoides 
1340 – Coleophora bidens 
1341 – Coleophora nemorella 
1342 – Coleophora intermediella 
1343 – Coleophora dextrella 
1344 – Coleophora detractella 
1345 – Coleophora prepostera 
1346 – Coleophora trilineella 
1347 – Coleophora littorella 
1348 – Coleophora salinoidella 
1349 – Coleophora lineapulvella 
1350 – Coleophora quadruplex 
1351 – Coleophora chambersella 
1352 – Coleophora sparsipulvella 
1353 – Coleophora ochrostriata 
1354 – Coleophora basistrigella 
1355 – Coleophora nigrostriata 
1356 – Coleophora bella 
1357 – Coleophora argentialbella 
1358 – Coleophora quadrilineella 
1359 – Coleophora cervinella 
1360 – Coleophora tenuis 
1361 – Coleophora borea 
1362 – Coleophora sparsiatomella 
1363 – Coleophora pulchricornis 
1364 – Coleophora vagans 
1365 – Coleophora cratipennella, streaked coleophora moth
1365.1 – Coleophora tamesis 
1366 – Coleophora benestrigatella 
1367 – Coleophora brunneipennis 
1368 – Coleophora bidentella 
1369 – Coleophora suaedicola 
1370 – Coleophora biforis 
1371 – Coleophora infuscatella 
1372 – Coleophora coenosipennella 
1373 – Coleophora contrariella 
1374 – Coleophora sexdentatella 
1375 – Coleophora caespititiella 
1376 – Coleophora latronella 
1377 – Coleophora glissandella 
1378 – Coleophora glaucicolella 
1379 – Coleophora alticolella 
1380 – Coleophora fagicorticella 
1381 – Coleophora bispinatella 
1382 – Coleophora dentiferoides 
1383 – Coleophora luteocostella 
1384 – Coleophora concolorella 
1385 – Coleophora maritella 
1386 – Coleophora viridicuprella 
1387 – Coleophora mayrella, metallic coleophora moth
1388 – Coleophora trifolii, large clover casebearer moth
1389 – Coleophora apicialbella 
1390 – Coleophora portulacae 
1391 – Coleophora aeneusella 
1392 – Coleophora aenusella 
1393 – Coleophora albacostella 
1394 – Coleophora biminimmaculella 
1395 – Coleophora fuscostrigella 
1396 – Coleophora indefinitella 
1396.1 – Coleophora xyridella 
1397 – Scythris inornatella 
1398 – Coleophora octagonella, octagonal casemaker moth
1398.1 – Coleophora arizoniella 
1398.2 – Coleophora deauratella 
1398.3 – Coleophora ladonia 
1398.4 – Coleophora ramitella 
1398.5 – Coleophora timarella 
1398.6 – Coleophora alabama 
1398.7 – Coleophora klimeschiella, Russian thistle casebearer moth
1398.8 – Coleophora parthenica, Russian thistle stem miner moth
1398.9 – Coleophora spinella, apple and plum casebearer moth
1399 – Batrachedra praeangusta 
1400 – Batrachedra striolata 
1401 – Batrachedra curvilineella 
1402 – Batrachedra folia 
1403 – Batrachedra salicipomonella 
1404 – Batrachedra illusor 
1405 – Batrachedra testor 
1406 – Batrachedra busiris 
1407 – Batrachedra calator 
1408 – Batrachedra concitata 
1409 – Batrachedra elucus 
1410 – Batrachedra garritor 
1411 – Batrachedra scitator 
1412 – Batrachedra hageter 
1413 – Batrachedra enormis, large batrachedra moth
1414 – Batrachedra mathesoni 
1415 – Batrachedra libator 
1416 – Batrachedra decoctor 
1416.1 – Batrachedra pinicolella 
1417 – Chedra inquisitor 
1418 – Chedra pensor 
1419 – Duospina abolitor 
1420 – Duospina trichella 
1421 – Homaledra heptathalama, exclamation moth
1422 – Homaledra sabalella, palm leaf skeletonizer moth

Momphidae
1423 – Mompha albapalpella
1423.1 – Mompha achlyognoma 
1424 – Mompha albella 
1425 – Mompha annulata 
1426 – Mompha argentimaculella 
1427 – Mompha bicristatella 
1428 – Mompha bifasciella 
1429 – Mompha bottimeri, Bottimer's mompha moth
1430 – Mompha brevivittella 
1431 – Mompha canicinctella 
1432 – Mompha capella 
1433 – Mompha cephalonthiella, buttonbush leafminer moth
1434 – Mompha circumscriptella, circumscript mompha moth
1435 – Mompha claudiella 
1435.1 – Mompha cleidarotrypa 
1436 – Mompha coloradella 
1437 – Mompha communis 
1438 – Mompha conturbatella, fireweed mompha moth
1439 – Mompha deceptella 
1440 – Mompha definitella 
1441 – Mompha difficilis 
1442 – Mompha edithella 
1443 – Mompha eloisella, red-streaked mompha moth
1443.1 – Mompha epilobiella 
1444 – Mompha ignotilisella 
1445 – Mompha luciferella 
1446 – Mompha metallifera 
1446.1 – Mompha franclemonti 
1446.2 – Mompha powelli 
1447 – Mompha minimella 
1448 – Mompha murtfeldtella 
1448.1 – Mompha nodicolella 
1449 – Mompha nuptialis 
1450 – Mompha passerella 
1451 – Mompha pecosella 
1452 – Mompha purpuriella 
1453 – Mompha rufocristatella 
1454 – Mompha sexstrigella 
1454.1 – Mompha nancyae 
1454.2 – Mompha solomoni 
1455 – Mompha stellella 
1456 – Mompha terminella 
1457 – Mompha idaei 
1457.1 – Mompha raschkiella 
1458 – Mompha unifasciella 
1459 – Synallagma busckiella 
1460 – Blastodacna bicristatella 
1461 – Blastodacna curvilineella

Cosmopterigidae
1461.1 – Blastodacna atra 
1461.2 – Blastodacna hellerella 
1462 – Chrysoclista cambiella 
1463 – Chrysoclista linneella, linden bark-borer moth
1464 – Chrysoclista villella 
no number yet – Chrysoclista grandis
1465 – Haplochrois bipunctella 
1466 – Antequera acertella 
1467 – Euclemensia bassettella, kermes scale moth
1468 – Euclemensia schwarziella 
1469 – Cosmopterix nitens 
1470 – Cosmopterix sinelinea 
1471 – Cosmopterix molybdina 
1472 – Cosmopterix pulchrimella, beautiful cosmopterix moth
1473 – Cosmopterix bendidia (=Cosmopterix astrapias)
1474 – Cosmopterix attenuatella 
1475 – Cosmopterix clandestinella 
1476 – Cosmopterix montisella 
1477 – Cosmopterix magophila 
1478 – Cosmopterix gracilens (=Cosmopterix inopis)
1479 – Cosmopterix dapifera 
1480 – Cosmopterix delicatella 
1481 – Cosmopterix dicacula (=Cosmopterix callichalca)
1482 – Cosmopterix lespedezae 
1483 – Cosmopterix opulenta 
1484 – Cosmopterix chisosensis 
1485 – Cosmopterix quadrilineella 
1486 – Cosmopterix minutella 
1487 – Cosmopterix abdita (=Cosmopterix teligera)
1488 – Cosmopterix inopis 
1489 – Cosmopterix chalybaeella 
1490 – Cosmopterix gemmiferella 
1491 – Cosmopterix bacata 
1492 – Cosmopterix damnosa 
1493 – Cosmopterix clemensella, Clemens' cosmopterix moth
1494 – Cosmopterix scirpicola 
1495 – Cosmopterix ebriola 
1496 – Cosmopterix fernaldella, Fernald's cosmopterix moth
1497 – Cosmopterix floridanella 
1498 – Cosmopterix facunda
no number – Cosmopterix erinome
no number – Cosmopterix thelxinoe
1499 – Pebops ipomoeae 
1500 – Tanygona lignicolorella 
1501 – Eralea albalineella 
1502 – Eralea abludo 
1503 – Melanocinclis lineigera 
1504 – Melanocinclis nigrilineella 
1505 – Melanocinclis sparsa 
1506 – Melanocinclis gnoma 
1507 – Melanocinclis vibex 
1508 – Stagmatophora sexnotella 
1509 – Stagmatophora wyattella, Wyatt's stagmatophora moth
1510 – Stagmatophora iridella 
1511 – Stagmatophora enchrysa 
1511.1 – Eteobalea intermediella 
1511.2 – Eteobalea serratella 
1512 – Pyroderces rileyi, pink scavenger caterpillar moth
1513 – Pyroderces badia, Florida pink scavenger moth
1514 – Pyroderces albistrigella 
1515 – Limnaecia phragmitella, shy cosmet moth
1516 – Teladoma helianthi 
1517 – Teladoma astigmatica 
1518 – Teladoma tonia 
1519 – Teladoma incana 
1520 – Teladoma murina 
1521 – Teladoma habra 
1522 – Teladoma nebula 
1523 – Teladoma exigua 
1524 – Triclonella pergandeella, sweetclover root borer moth
1525 – Triclonella xuthocelis 
1526 – Triclonella antidectis 
1527 – Triclonella determinatella 
1528 – Triclonella bicoloripennis 
1529 – Anoncia conia 
1530 – Anoncia brunneipes 
1531 – Anoncia sphacelina 
1532 – Anoncia fasciata 
1533 – Anoncia alboligula 
1534 – Anoncia slales 
1535 – Anoncia glacialis 
1536 – Anoncia bitoqua 
1537 – Anoncia porriginosa 
1538 – Anoncia flegax 
1539 – Anoncia aciculata 
1540 – Anoncia mones 
1541 – Anoncia naclia 
1542 – Anoncia callida 
1543 – Anoncia nocticola 
1544 – Anoncia nebritis 
1545 – Anoncia psepsa 
1546 – Anoncia leucoritis 
1547 – Anoncia longa 
1548 – Anoncia furvicosta 
1549 – Anoncia diveni 
1550 – Anoncia orites 
1551 – Anoncia fregeis 
1552 – Anoncia loexya 
1553 – Anoncia noscres 
1554 – Anoncia episcia 
1555 – Anoncia venis 
1556 – Anoncia piperata 
1557 – Anoncia mosa 
1558 – Anoncia smogops 
1559 – Anoncia psentia 
1559.1 – Anoncia texanella 
1560 – Periploca orichalcella 
1561 – Periploca arsa 
1562 – Periploca ceanothiella 
1563 – Periploca gleditschiaeella 
1564 – Periploca intermedia 
1565 – Periploca repanda 
1566 – Periploca hostiata 
1567 – Periploca teres 
1568 – Periploca tridens 
1569 – Periploca hortatrix 
1570 – Periploca opinatrix 
1571 – Periploca atrata 
1572 – Periploca mimula 
1573 – Periploca laeta 
1574 – Periploca cata 
1575 – Periploca devia 
1576 – Periploca soror 
1577 – Periploca nigra 
1578 – Periploca fessa 
1579 – Periploca gulosa 
1580 – Periploca facula 
1581 – Periploca juniperae 
1582 – Periploca funebris 
1583 – Periploca serrulata 
1584 – Periploca dentella 
1585 – Periploca dipapha 
1586 – Periploca labes 
1587 – Siskiwitia alticolans 
1588 – Siskiwitia latebra 
1589 – Siskiwitia falcata 
1590 – Pristen corusca 
1591 – Synploca gumia 
1592 – Stilbosis juvantis 
1593 – Stilbosis dulcedo 
1594 – Stilbosis venifica 
1595 – Stilbosis venatrix 
1596 – Stilbosis ostryaeella, ironwood leafminer moth
1597 – Stilbosis quadricustatella 
1598 – Stilbosis stipator 
1599 – Stilbosis risor 
1600 – Stilbosis victor 
1601 – Stilbosis placatrix 
1602 – Stilbosis sagana 
1603 – Stilbosis rhynchosiae 
1604 – Stilbosis extensa 
1605 – Stilbosis pagina 
1606 – Stilbosis ornatrix 
1607 – Stilbosis scleroma 
1608 – Stilbosis rotunda 
1609 – Stilbosis tesquella 
1610 – Stilbosis nubila 
1611 – Stilbosis lonchocarpella 
1612 – Chrysopeleia purpuriella 
1613 – Walshia particornella 
1614 – Walshia elegans 
1615 – Walshia miscecolorella, sweetclover root borer moth
1616 – Walshia amorphella 
1617 – Walshia floridensis 
1618 – Walshia exemplata 
1619 – Walshia similis 
1620 – Walshia dispar 
1621 – Nepotula secura 
1622 – Afeda biloba 
1623 – Perimede erransella 
1624 – Perimede battis 
1625 – Perimede latris 
1626 – Perimede grandis 
1627 – Perimede parilis 
1628 – Perimede circitor 
1629 – Perimede erema 
1630 – Perimede maniola 
1631 – Perimede ricina 
1632 – Perimede falcata 
1633 – Sorhagenia nimbosa, midrib gall moth
1634 – Sorhagenia cracens 
1635 – Sorhagenia daedala 
1636 – Sorhagenia baucidis 
1637 – Sorhagenia pexa 
1638 – Ithome concolorella, kiawe flower moth
1639 – Ithome curvipunctella 
1640 – Ithome ferax 
1641 – Ithome edax 
1642 – Ithome aquila 
1643 – Ithome lassula 
1644 – Ithome simulatrix 
1645 – Obithome punctiferella 
1647 – Calosima albapenella 
1648 – Asymmetrura albilineata

Scythrididae
1649 – Rhamphura altisierrae 
1650 – Scythris anthracina 
1651 – Scythris inspersella 
1652 – Scythris basilaris 
1652.1 – Scythris brevistrigella 
1653 – Scythris charon 
1654 – Neoscythris confinis 
1654.1 – Neoscythris euthia 
1655 – Scythris eboracensis 
1657 – Arotrura eburnea 
1657.1 – Arotrura powelli 
1657.2 – Arotrura atascosa 
1657.3 – Arotrura divaricata 
1658 – Neoscythris fissirostris 
1659 – Scythris fuscicomella 
1660 – Asymmetrura graminivorella 
1662 – Landryia impositella 
1662.1 – Landryia matutella 
1663 – Scythris interrupta 
1664 – Scythris noricella 
1665 – Scythris mixaula 
1666 – Rhamphura ochristriata 
1667 – Arotrura oxyplecta 
1667.1 – Arotrura formidabilis 
1667.2 – Arotrura longissima 
1668 – Scythris immaculatella 
1669 – Rhamphura perspicillella 
1670 – Scythris pilosella 
1671 – Scythris piratica 
1672 – Neoscythris planipenella 
1673 – Scythris limbella, chenopodium scythris moth
1674 – Asymmetrura reducta 
1675 – Asymmetrura scintillifera 
1676 – Arotrura sponsella 
1676.1 – Arotrura balli 
1676.2 – Arotrura hymenata 
1677 – Rhamphura suffusa 
1678 – Scythris trivinctella, banded scythris moth
1679 – Scythris ypsilon 
1680 – Areniscythris brachypteris

Gelechiidae
1681 – Nealyda bifidella 
1682 – Nealyda kinzelella 
1683 – Nealyda phytolaccae 
1684 – Nealyda pisoniae 
1685 – Metzneria lappella, burdock seedhead moth
1686 – Metzneria paucipunctella 
1687 – Megacraspedus plutella 
1688 – Isophrictis actiella 
1689 – Isophrictis actinopa 
1690 – Isophrictis anteliella 
1691 – Isophrictis canicostella 
1692 – Isophrictis cilialineella 
1693 – Isophrictis dietziella 
1694 – Isophrictis magnella 
1695 – Isophrictis modesta 
1696 – Isophrictis occidentalis 
1697 – Isophrictis pallidastrigella 
1698 – Isophrictis pallidella 
1699 – Isophrictis pennella 
1700 – Isophrictis rudbeckiella 
1701 – Isophrictis sabulella 
1702 – Isophrictis similiella 
1703 – Isophrictis striatella 
1704 – Isophrictis tophella 
1705 – Isophrictis trimaculella 
1706 – Monochroa absconditella 
1707 – Monochroa angustipennella 
1708 – Monochroa disconotella 
1709 – Monochroa discriminata 
1710 – Monochroa gilvolinella 
1711 – Monochroa fragariae, strawberry crown miner moth
1712 W – Monochroa harrisonella 
1713 – Monochroa monactis 
1714 – Monochroa perterrita 
1715 W – Monochroa placidella 
1716 – Monochroa quinquepunctella 
1717 – Chrysoesthia drurella, goosefoot leafminer moth
1718 – Chrysoesthia lingulacella 
1719 – Chrysoesthia sexguttella, orache leafminer moth
1720 – Chrysoesthia versicolorella 
1721 – Enchrysa dissectella 
1722 – Theisoa constrictella 
1723 – Theisoa multifasciella 
1724 – Theisoa pallidochrella 
1725 – Stereomita andropogonis 
1726 – Aristotelia adceanotha 
1727 – Aristotelia adenostomae 
1728 – Aristotelia amelanchierella 
1729 – Aristotelia aquosa 
1730 – Aristotelia argentifera 
1731 – Aristotelia bifasciella 
1732 – Aristotelia callens 
1733 – Aristotelia callirrhoda 
1733.1 – Aristotelia corallina 
1734 – Aristotelia devexella 
1735 – Aristotelia eldorada 
1736 – Aristotelia elegantella, elegant aristotelia moth
1737 – Aristotelia eumeris 
1738 – Aristotelia fungivorella 
1739 – Aristotelia hexacopa 
1740 – Aristotelia intermediella 
1741 – Aristotelia iospora 
1742 – Aristotelia isopelta 
1743 – Aristotelia ivae 
1744 – Aristotelia lespedezae 
1745 – Aristotelia lindanella 
1746 – Aristotelia melanaphra 
1747 – Aristotelia molestella 
1748 – Aristotelia monilella 
1749 – Aristotelia nigrobasiella 
1750 – Aristotelia ochroxysta 
1752 – Aristotelia physaliella 
1753 – Aristotelia planitia 
1754 – Aristotelia primipilana 
1755 – Aristotelia psoraleae 
1756 – Aristotelia pudibundella 
1757 – Aristotelia pullusella 
1758 – Aristotelia rhamnina 
1759 – Aristotelia rhoisella 
1760 – Aristotelia robusta 
1761 – Aristotelia roseosuffusella 
1762 – Aristotelia rubidella 
1763 – Aristotelia salicifungiella 
1764 – Aristotelia urbaurea 
1765 – Numata bipunctella 
1766 – Glauce pectenalaeella 
1767 – Naera fuscocristatella 
1768 – Evippe abdita 
1769 – Evippe laudatella 
1770 – Evippe leuconota 
1771 – Evippe prunifoliella 
1772 – Agnippe biscolorella 
1773 – Agnippe crinella 
1774 – Agnippe evippeella 
1775 – Agnippe fuscopulvella 
1776 – Tosca elachistella 
1777 – Tosca plutonella 
1778 – Tosca pollostella 
1779 – Argyrolacia bifida 
1780 – Recurvaria ceanothiella 
1781 – Recurvaria consimilis 
1782 – Recurvaria francisca 
1783 – Recurvaria nanella, lesser bud moth
1784 – Recurvaria stibomorpha 
1785 – Recurvaria taphiopis 
1786 – Recurvaria vestigata 
1787 – Coleotechnites albicostatus, white-edged coleotechnites moth
1788 – Coleotechnites alnifructella 
1789 – Coleotechnites apicitripunctella, green hemlock needleminer moth
1790 – Coleotechnites ardas 
1791 – Coleotechnites argentiabella 
1792 – Coleotechnites atrupictella 
1793 – Coleotechnites australis 
1794 – Coleotechnites bacchariella, coyote brush twig borer moth
1795 – Coleotechnites biopes 
1796 – Coleotechnites blastovora 
1797 – Coleotechnites canusella, banded jack-pine needleminer moth
1798 – Coleotechnites carbonarius 
1799 – Coleotechnites chilcotti, Chilcott's coleotechnites moth
1800 – Coleotechnites citriella 
1801 – Coleotechnites colubrinae 
1802 – Coleotechnites condignella 
1803 – Coleotechnites coniferella, conifer coleotechnites moth
1804 – Coleotechnites cristatella 
1805 – Coleotechnites vagatioella 
1806 – Coleotechnites ducharmei 
1806.1 – Coleotechnites edulicola 
1807 – Coleotechnites elucidella 
1808 – Coleotechnites eryngiella 
1809 – Coleotechnites florae, coleotechnites flower moth
1810 – Coleotechnites gallicola 
1811 – Coleotechnites gibsonella 
1812 – Coleotechnites granti 
1813 – Coleotechnites huntella 
1814 – Coleotechnites invictella 
1815 – Coleotechnites juniperella 
1816 – Coleotechnites laricis, orange larch tubemaker moth
1817 – Coleotechnites lewisi 
1818 – Coleotechnites mackiei 
1819 – Coleotechnites macleodi, brown hemlock needleminer moth
1820 – Coleotechnites martini 
1821 – Coleotechnites milleri, lodgepole needleminer moth
1822 – Coleotechnites moreonella 
1823 – Coleotechnites nigritus 
1824 – Coleotechnites obliquistrigella 
1825 – Coleotechnites occidentis 
1826 – Coleotechnites piceaella, orange spruce needleminer moth
1827 – Coleotechnites pinella 
1827.1 – Coleotechnites ponderosae 
1828 – Coleotechnites quercivorella 
1829 – Coleotechnites resinosae, red pine needleminer moth
1830 – Coleotechnites stanfordia 
1831 – Coleotechnites starki 
1832 – Coleotechnites thujaella, brown cedar leafminer moth
1833 – Coleotechnites variella 
1834 – Sinoe robiniella
1834.1 – Sinoe chambersi
1834.2 – Sinoe kwakae
no number yet – Sinoe capsana
1835 – Exoteleia burkei 
1836 – Exoteleia californica 
1837 – Exoteleia dodecella, pine bud moth
1838 – Exoteleia graphicella 
1839 – Exoteleia nepheos, pine candle moth
1840 – Exoteleia pinifoliella, pine needleminer moth
1840.1 – Exoteleia anomala 
1841 – Trypanisma prudens 
1842 – Taygete attributella 
1843 – Taygete citrinella 
1844 – Taygete decemmaculella 
1845 – Taygete gallaegenitella 
1846 – Taygete saundersella 
1847 – Taygete sylvicolella 
1848 – Leucogoniella californica 
1849 – Leucogoniella distincta 
1850 – Leucogoniella subsimella 
1851 – Arogalea cristifasciella, stripe-backed moth
1852 – Athrips mouffetella, ten-spotted honeysuckle moth
1853 – Athrips pruinosella 
1854 – Athrips rancidella, cotoneaster webworm moth
1855 – Telphusa alexandriacella 
1856 – Telphusa fasciella 
1857 – Telphusa latifasciella, white-banded telphusa moth
1858 – Telphusa longifasciella 
1859 – Telphusa sedulitella
no number – Telphusa nigrimaculata
1860 – Pseudochelaria arbutina 
1861 – Pseudochelaria manzanitae 
1862 – Pseudochelaria pennsylvanica 
1863 – Pseudochelaria scabrella 
1864 – Pseudochelaria walsinghami 
1864.1 – Gnorimoschema herbichi 
1865 – Neotelphusa praefixa 
1866 – Neotelphusa querciella 
1867 – Pseudotelphusa amelanchierella 
1868 – Pseudotelphusa basifasciella 
1869 – Pseudotelphusa belangerella 
1870 – Pseudotelphusa betulella 
1871 – Pseudotelphusa fuscopunctella 
1872 – Pseudotelphusa incana 
1873 – Pseudotelphusa palliderosacella 
1874 – Pseudotelphusa quercinigracella 
1874.1 – Arcutelphusa talladega 
1874.2 – Carpatolechia fugitivella 
1875 – Xenolechia aethiops 
1876 – Xenolechia quinquecristatella 
1877 – Xenolechia basistrigella 
1878 – Xenolechia ontariensis 
1879 – Xenolechia querciphaga 
1880 – Xenolechia velatella
no number – Xenolechia ceanothiae
1880.1 – Stenolechia bathrodyas 
1881 – Teleiodes sequax, crepuscular rock-rose moth
1881.1 – Teleiodes proximella 
1882 – Teleiopsis baldiana 
1883 – Prolita barnesiella 
1884 – Prolita deoia 
1885 – Prolita dialis 
1886 – Prolita geniata 
1887 – Prolita incicur 
1888 – Prolita invariabilis 
1889 – Prolita jubata 
1890 – Prolita maenadis 
1891 – Prolita nefrens 
1892 – Prolita obnubila 
1893 – Prolita pagella 
1894 – Prolita princeps 
1895 – Prolita puertella 
1896 – Prolita recens 
1897 – Prolita rectistrigella 
1898 – Prolita sexpunctella 
1899 – Prolita sironae 
1900 – Prolita texanella 
1901 – Prolita thaliae 
1902 – Prolita variabilis 
1903 – Prolita veledae 
1904 – Arla diversella 
1905 – Arla tenuicornis 
1906 – Neodactylota basilica 
1907 – Neodactylota egena 
1908 – Neodactylota liguritrix 
1909 – Neodactylota snellenella 
1910 – Eudactylota abstemia 
1911 – Eudactylota barberella 
1912 – Eudactylota diadota 
1913 – Eudactylota iobapta 
1914 – Friseria acaciella 
1915 – Friseria caieta 
1916 – Friseria cockerelli, mesquite webworm moth
1917 – Friseria nona 
1918 – Rifseria fuscotaeniaella 
1919 – Sriferia cockerella 
1920 – Sriferia fulmenella 
1921 – Sriferia oxymeris 
1922 – Bryotropha branella 
1922.1 – Bryotropha plantariella 
1922.2 – Bryotropha galbanella 
1922.3 – Bryotropha gemella 
1923 – Bryotropha similis 
1923.1 – Bryotropha hodgesi 
1923.2 – Bryotropha altitudophila 
1926 – Deltophora duplicata 
1927 – Deltophora glandiferella 
1928 – Deltophora sella 
1929 – Gelechia albisparsella 
1930 – Gelechia anarsiella 
1931 – Gelechia badiomaculella 
1932 – Gelechia benitella 
1933 – Gelechia bianulella 
1934 – Gelechia bistrigella 
1936 – Gelechia capiteochrella 
1937 – Gelechia caudatae 
1938 – Gelechia desiliens 
1939 – Gelechia discostrigella 
1940 – Gelechia dromicella 
1941 – Gelechia dyariella 
1942 – Gelechia flexurella 
1943 – Gelechia gracula 
1944 – Gelechia grisaeella 
1945 – Gelechia griseochrella 
1946 – Gelechia lynceella 
1947 – Gelechia maculatusella 
1948 – Gelechia mandella 
1949 – Gelechia mimella 
1950 – Gelechia monella 
1951 – Gelechia mundata 
1952 – Gelechia obscurella 
1954 – Gelechia ocherfuscella 
1955 – Gelechia packardella 
1956 – Gelechia pallidagriseella 
1957 – Gelechia palpialbella 
1958 – Gelechia panella 
1960 – Gelechia ribesella 
1961 – Gelechia rileyella 
1962 – Gelechia sabinella, juniper gelechiid moth
1963 – Gelechia thoracestrigella 
1964 – Gelechia thymiata 
1965 – Gelechia unistrigella 
1966 – Gelechia versutella 
1967 – Gelechia wacoella 
1968 – Gnorimoschema alaricella 
1969 – Gnorimoschema albangulatum 
1969.1 – Gnorimoschema albestre 
1970 – Gnorimoschema albimarginella 
1971 – Gnorimoschema ambrosiella 
1971.1 – Gnorimoschema anomale 
1971.2 – Gnorimoschema assimile 
1971.3 – Gnorimoschema aterrimum 
1971.4 – Gnorimoschema baccariselloides 
1972 – Gnorimoschema baccharisella, coyote brush gall moth
1973 – Gnorimoschema banksiella 
1974 – Gnorimoschema batanella 
1974.1 – Gnorimoschema brachiatum 
1975 – Gnorimoschema busckiella 
1975.1 – Gnorimoschema clavatum 
1976 – Gnorimoschema collinusella 
1977 – Gnorimoschema compsomorpha 
1978 – Gnorimoschema contrarium 
1979 – Gnorimoschema coquillettella 
1979.1 – Gnorimoschema crypticum 
1979.2 – Gnorimoschema curiosum 
1979.3 – Gnorimoschema debenedicti 
1980 – Gnorimoschema dudiella 
1980.1 – Gnorimoschema elatior 
1981 – Gnorimoschema marmorella 
1982 – Gnorimoschema ericameriae 
1982.1 – Gnorimoschema ericoidesi 
1983 – Gnorimoschema faustella 
1983.1 – Gnorimoschema ferrugineum 
1984 – Gnorimoschema florella 
1984.1 – Gnorimoschema foliatum 
1985 – Gnorimoschema gallaeasterella 
1986 – Gnorimoschema gallaesolidaginis, goldenrod gall moth
1986.1 – Gnorimoschema gallaespeciosum 
1986.2 – Gnorimoschema geminum 
1986.3 – Gnorimoschema generale 
1987 – Gnorimoschema gibsoniella 
1987.1 – Gnorimoschema gracile 
1987.2 – Gnorimoschema grindeliae 
1988 – Gnorimoschema grisella 
1989 – Gnorimoschema inexpertum 
1989.1 – Gnorimoschema intermedium 
1989.2 – Gnorimoschema interrogationum 
1989.3 – Gnorimoschema jocelynae 
1989.4 – Gnorimoschema lateritium 
1989.5 – Gnorimoschema ligulatum 
1990 – Neoschema klotsi 
1990.1 – Neoschema powelli 
1991 – Gnorimoschema lipatiella 
1991.1 – Gnorimoschema lobatum 
1992 – Gnorimoschema milleriella 
1993 – Gnorimoschema minor 
1993.1 – Gnorimoschema nanulum 
1994 – Gnorimoschema nordlandicolella 
1994.1 – Gnorimoschema novajorum 
1994.2 – Gnorimoschema obscurior 
1995 – Gnorimoschema octomaculella 
1995.1 – Gnorimoschema ovinum 
1995.2 – Gnorimoschema paternale 
1996 – Gnorimoschema pedmontella 
1996.1 – Gnorimoschema penetrans 
1996.2 – Gnorimoschema perditum 
1996.3 – Gnorimoschema petiolatum 
1996.4 – Gnorimoschema pocketosum 
1996.5 – Gnorimoschema powelli 
1996.6 – Gnorimoschema reichli 
1996.7 – Gnorimoschema rotundatum 
1997 – Gnorimoschema salinaris 
1998 – Gnorimoschema saphirinella 
1998.1 – Gnorimoschema segregatum 
1999 – Gnorimoschema semicyclionella 
1999.1 – Eurysaccoides alternatus 
2000 – Gnorimoschema septentrionella 
2001 – Gnorimoschema serratipalpella 
2001.1 – Gnorimoschema signatum 
2001.2 – Gnorimoschema siskiouense 
2001.3 – Gnorimoschema slabaughi 
2001.4 – Gnorimoschema spinosum 
2001.5 – Gnorimoschema huffmanellum 
2002 – Gnorimoschema splendoriferella 
2003 – Gnorimoschema sporomochla 
2003.1 – Gnorimoschema stigmaticum 
2004 – Gnorimoschema subterraneum 
2004.1 – Gnorimoschema tediosum 
2004.2 – Gnorimoschema tenerum 
2005 – Gnorimoschema terracottella 
2005.1 – Gnorimoschema triforceps 
2005.2 – Gnorimoschema trilobatum 
2006 – Gnorimoschema triocellella 
2006.1 – Gnorimoschema tunicatum 
2007 – Gnorimoschema valesiella 
2008 – Gnorimoschema vastificum 
2009 – Gnorimoschema versicolorella 
2009.1 – Gnorimoschema wagneri 
2010 – Gnorimoschema washingtoniella 
2011 – Phthorimaea operculella, potato tuberworm moth
2012 – Scrobipalpula artemisiella, thyme moth
2012.1 – Scrobipalpula antiocha 
2013 – Tuta chiquitella 
2013.1 – Tuta chiquitelloides 
2013.2 – Tuta elaborata 
2013.3 – Tuta insularis 
2013.4 – Tuta isolata 
2013.5 – Tuta spinosa 
2013.6 – Tuta totalis 
2013.7 – Tuta truncata 
2014 – Scrobipalpula erigeronella 
2014.1 – Scrobipalpula gutierreziae 
2015 – Scrobipalpula henshawiella 
2016 – Scrobipalpula hodgesi 
2017 – Scrobipalpulopsis lutescella 
2017.1 – Scrobipalpulopsis lycii 
2018 – Scrobipalpula ochroschista 
2018.1 – Scrobipalpula psilella 
2019 – Scrobipalpula polemoniella 
2020 – Scrobipalpula potentella 
2021 – Scrobipalpula radiatella 
2022 – Scrobipalpula sacculicola 
2023 – Scrobipalpula semirosea 
2024 – Euscrobipalpa atriplex 
2025 – Euscrobipalpa atriplicella 
2025.1 – Euscrobipalpa artemisiella 
2026 – Scrobipalpa consueta 
2027 – Scrobipalpa macromaculata 
2028 – Scrobipalpa monumentella 
2029 – Euscrobipalpa obsoletella 
2029.1 – Euscrobipalpa instabilella 
2029.2 – Euscrobipalpa arenacearella 
2029.3 – Nevadopalpa striata 
2029.4 – Nevadopalpa minor 
2029.5 – Nevadopalpa albula 
2029.6 – Nevadopalpa alboaura 
2029.7 – Nevadopalpa deaurata 
2029.8 – Nevadopalpa maculata 
2029.9 – Nevadopalpa nevadana 
2030 – Scrobipalpa scutellariaeela 
2030.1 – Neopalpa neonata 
2030.2 – Microcraspedus fontosus 
2030.3 – Eurysaccoides gallaespinosae 
2031 – Exceptia neopetrella 
2031.1 – Exceptia sisterina 
2032 – Symmetrischema capsicum, pepper flowerbud moth
2033 – Symmetrischema fercularium 
2034 – Symmetrischema inexpectatum 
2035 – Symmetrischema lavernella 
2036 – Symmetrischema lectuliferum 
2037 – Symmetrischema pallidochrella 
2038 – Symmetrischema plaesiosema 
2038.1 – Symmetrischema tangolias 
2039 – Symmetrischema striatella 
2039.1 – Symmetrischema kendallorum 
2040 – Caryocolum cassella 
2041 – Caryocolum protecta 
2041.1 – Caryocolum marmorea 
2041.2 – Caryocolum nearcticum 
2041.3 – Caryocolum proxima 
2042 – Caryocolum pullatella 
2043 – Scrobipalpopsis arnicella 
2044 – Ptycerata busckella 
2045 – Ptycerata petrella 
2046 – Scrobipalpopsis tetradymiella 
2046.1 – Scrobipalpopsis madiae 
2046.2 – Scrobipalpopsis interposita 
2047 – Keiferia lycopersicella, tomato pinworm moth
2047.1 – Keiferia elmorei 
2048 – Keiferia altisolani 
2048.1 – Keiferia georgei 
2049 – Keiferia glochinella, eggplant leafminer moth
2050 – Keiferia inconspicuella
no number – Keiferia educata
no number – Keiferia powelli
2051 – Frumenta nephelomicta 
2052 – Frumenta nundinella 
2053 – Agonochaetia conspersa 
2054 – Chionodes abdominella 
2055 – Chionodes abella 
2057 – Chionodes acerella 
2057.1 – Chionodes metoecus 
2058 – Chionodes acrina 
2058.1 – Chionodes adam 
2058.2 – Chionodes altor 
2058.3 – Chionodes cautor 
2058.4 – Chionodes irreptor 
2058.5 – Chionodes baro 
2058.6 – Chionodes secutor 
2059 – Chionodes agriodes 
2059.1 – Chionodes rupex 
2059.2 – Chionodes gratus 
2059.3 – Chionodes cusor 
2059.4 – Chionodes fimus 
2059.5 – Microcraspedus powelli 
2060 – Chionodes arenella 
2061 – Chionodes argentipunctella 
2061.1 – Chionodes hapsus 
2061.2 – Chionodes abitus 
2061.3 – Chionodes suasor 
2061.4 – Chionodes percultor 
2062 – Chionodes aristella 
2063 – Chionodes bicolor 
2064 – Chionodes bicostomaculella 
2065 – Chionodes braunella 
2065.1 – Chionodes cacula 
2065.2 – Chionodes impes 
2066 – Chionodes canofusella 
2066.1 – Chionodes aruns 
2066.2 – Chionodes chlorocephala 
2067 – Chionodes ceanothiella 
2067.1 – Chionodes ceryx 
2067.2 – Chionodes kubai 
2068 – Chionodes chrysopyla 
2069 – Chionodes continuella, spring oak leafroller moth
2069.1 – Chionodes sattleri 
2069.2 – Chionodes offectus 
2069.3 – Chionodes fictor 
2070 – Chionodes dammersi 
2071 – Chionodes dentella 
2071.1 – Chionodes landryi 
2071.2 – Chionodes thyotes 
2072 – Chionodes discoocellella, eyeringed chionodes moth
2072.1 – Chionodes donatella 
2072.2 – Chionodes drapeta 
2072.3 – Chionodes emptor 
2072.4 – Chionodes esor 
2073 – Chionodes figurella 
2074 – Chionodes flavicorporella 
2075 – Chionodes praeclarella 
2076 – Chionodes fondella 
2077 – Chionodes formosella, spring oak leafroller moth
2077.1 – Chionodes franclemonti 
2078 – Chionodes fructuaria 
2078.1 – Chionodes cibus 
2078.2 – Chionodes bardus 
2079 – Chionodes fuscomaculella 
2080 – Chionodes gilvomaculella 
2080.1 – Chionodes abavus 
2080.2 – Chionodes tarmes 
2081 – Chionodes grandis 
2081.1 – Chionodes factor 
2081.2 – Chionodes hospes 
2081.3 – Chionodes pallor 
2081.4 – Chionodes dolo 
2081.5 – Chionodes rectifex 
2082 – Chionodes halycopa 
2083 – Chionodes helicosticta 
2084 – Chionodes hibiscella 
2084.1 – Chionodes imber 
2084.2 – Chionodes bios 
2085 – Chionodes iridescens 
2086 – Chionodes kincaidella 
2086.1 – Chionodes macor 
2086.2 – Chionodes oecus 
no number yet – Chionodes hodgesorum
2086.3 – Chionodes repertor 
2087.1 – Chionodes latro 
2089 – Chionodes lophosella 
2090 – Chionodes lugubrella 
2090.1 – Chionodes obelus 
2091 – Chionodes luteogeminatus 
2092 – Chionodes mariona 
2092.1 – Chionodes petro 
2093 – Chionodes mediofuscella, black-smudged chionodes moth
2094 – Chionodes metallica 
2094.1 – Chionodes sepultor 
2094.2 – Chionodes canor 
2094.3 – Chionodes histon 
2094.4 – Chionodes lictor 
2094.5 – Chionodes praecia 
2095 – Chionodes nanodella 
2095.1 – Chionodes donahueorum 
2095.2 – Chionodes pulvis 
2095.3 – Chionodes sannio 
2095.4 – Chionodes stator 
2095.5 – Chionodes meddix 
2095.6 – Chionodes lactans 
2095.7 – Chionodes volo 
2095.8 – Chionodes obex 
2095.9 – Chionodes munifex 
2097 – Chionodes nigrobarbata 
2097.1 – Chionodes praetor 
2097.2 – Chionodes naevus 
2097.3 – Chionodes davisi 
2098 – Chionodes notandella 
2098.1 – Chionodes morus 
2099 – Chionodes obscurusella, boxelder leafworm moth
2100 – Chionodes occidentella 
2100.1 – Chionodes fremor 
2100.2 – Chionodes soter 
2100.3 – Chionodes lusor 
2101 – Chionodes occlusa 
2101.1 – Chionodes boreas 
2101.2 – Chionodes trico 
2101.3 – Chionodes veles 
2101.4 – Chionodes theurgis 
2101.5 – Chionodes gerdius 
2101.6 – Chionodes tributor 
2102 – Chionodes ochreostrigella 
2102.1 – Chionodes rhombus 
2103 – Chionodes paralogella 
2104 – Chionodes pereyra 
2105 – Chionodes periculella 
2105.1 – Chionodes pavor 
2105.2 – Chionodes johnstoni 
2105.3 – Chionodes pacator 
2106 – Chionodes permacta 
2106.1 – Chionodes clarkei 
2107 – Chionodes petalumensis 
2108 – Chionodes phalacra 
2108.1 – Chionodes popa 
2109 – Chionodes pinguicula 
2109.1 – Chionodes powelli 
2109.2 – Chionodes plutor 
2109.3 – Chionodes nepos 
2109.4 – Chionodes procus 
2109.5 – Chionodes paean 
2110 – Chionodes pseudofondella 
2110.1 – Chionodes bibo 
2111 – Chionodes psiloptera 
2111.1 – Chionodes rabula 
2111.2 – Chionodes aleo 
2112 – Chionodes retiniella 
2112.1 – Chionodes elainae 
2112.2 – Chionodes luror 
2113 – Chionodes sabinianae 
2114 – Chionodes salicella 
2114.1 – Chionodes lector 
2114.2 – Chionodes hostis 
2115.1 – Chionodes sevir 
2116 – Chionodes sistrella 
2117 – Chionodes terminimaculella 
2117.1 – Chionodes erro 
2118 – Chionodes tessa 
2118.1 – Chionodes rector 
2118.2 – Chionodes delitor 
2118.3 – Chionodes nitor 
2118.4 – Chionodes sanator 
2118.5 – Chionodes regens 
2119 – Chionodes thoraceochrella 
2120 – Chionodes trichostola 
2120.1 – Chionodes parens 
2120.2 – Chionodes restio 
2120.3 – Chionodes pinax 
2120.4 – Chionodes adamas 
2121 – Chionodes trophella 
2121.1 – Chionodes ludio 
2121.2 – Chionodes messor 
2121.3 – Chionodes optio 
2121.4 – Chionodes pastor 
2121.5 – Chionodes nubis 
2121.6 – Chionodes magirus 
2121.7 – Chionodes innox 
2121.8 – Chionodes gestor 
2123 – Chionodes viduella 
2123.1 – Chionodes ensis 
2124 – Chionodes whitmanella 
2124.1 – Chionodes senica 
2124.2 – Chionodes dator 
2124.3 – Chionodes sponsus 
2124.4 – Chionodes ustor 
2124.5 – Chionodes rogator 
2124.6 – Chionodes mikkolai 
2124.7 – Chionodes praeco 
2124.8 – Chionodes molitor 
2125 – Chionodes xanthophilella 
2126 – Neofaculta infernella 
2127 – Filatima abactella 
2127.1 – Filatima adamsi 
2128 – Filatima albicostella 
2129 – Filatima albilorella 
2130 – Filatima albipectis 
2131 – Filatima arizonella 
2132 – Filatima aulaea 
2133 – Filatima betulae 
2134 – Filatima biforella 
2135 – Filatima bigella 
2136 – Filatima biminimaculella 
2137 – Filatima catacrossa 
2138 – Filatima collinearis 
2139 – Filatima confusatella 
2140 – Filatima cushmani 
2141 – Filatima dimissae 
2142 – Filatima depuratella 
2143 – Filatima epulatrix 
2144 – Filatima frugalis 
2145 – Filatima fuliginea 
2146 – Filatima glycyrhizaeella 
2147 – Filatima golovina 
2148 – Filatima gomphopis 
2149 – Filatima hemicrossa 
2150 – Filatima inquilinella 
2151 – Filatima isocrossa 
2152 – Filatima monotaeniella 
2153 – Filatima natalis 
2154 – Filatima neotrophella 
2155 – Filatima nigripectus 
2156 – Filatima normifera 
2157 – Filatima nucifer 
2158 – Filatima obidenna 
2159 – Filatima obscuroocellella 
2160 – Filatima obscurosuffusella 
2160.1 – Filatima occidua 
2161 – Filatima ochreosuffusella 
2162 – Filatima ornatifimbriella 
2163 – Filatima perpensa 
2164 – Filatima persicaeella 
2165 – Filatima platyochra 
2166 – Filatima pravinominella 
2167 – Filatima procedes 
2168 – Filatima prognosticata 
2169 – Filatima pseudacaciella, dusky-backed filatima moth
2170 – Filatima roceliella 
2171 – Filatima saliciphaga 
2172 – Filatima serotinella 
2173 – Filatima shastaella 
2174 – Filatima sperryi 
2175 – Filatima spinigera 
2176 – Filatima striatella 
2177 – Filatima tephrinopa 
2178 – Filatima tridentata 
2179 – Filatima vaccinii 
2180 – Filatima vaniae 
2181 – Filatima xanthuris
no number yet – Filatima loowita
no number yet – Filatima revisensis
2182 – Aroga acharnaea 
2183 – Aroga alleriella 
2184 – Aroga argutiola 
2185 – Aroga camptogramma 
2186 – Aroga chlorocrana 
2187 – Aroga compositella, six-spotted aroga moth
2188 – Aroga eldorada 
2189 – Aroga epigaeella 
2190 – Aroga eriogonella 
2191 – Aroga leucanieella 
2192 – Aroga morenella 
2193 – Aroga paraplutella 
2194 – Aroga paulella 
2195 – Aroga rigidae 
2196 – Aroga thoracealbella 
2197 – Aroga trachycosma 
2198 – Aroga trialbamaculella, red-striped fireworm moth
2199 – Aroga trilineella 
2200 – Aroga unifasciella 
2201 – Aroga websteri 
2202 – Aroga xyloglypta 
2203 – Fascista bimaculella 
2204 – Fascista cercerisella, redbud leaffolder moth
2205 – Fascista quinella 
2206 – Faculta inaequalis 
2207 – Faculta triangulella 
2208 – Mirificarma eburnella 
2209 – Stegasta bosqueella, red-necked peanutworm moth
2210 – Polyhymno acaciella 
2211 – Polyhymno luteostrigella, polyhymno moth
2212 – Calliprora sexstrigella 
2213 – Sophronia primella 
2214 – Sophronia roseicrinella 
2215 – Sophronia teretracma 
2216 – Ymeldia janae, Jane's ymeldia moth
2217 – Aproaerema anthyllidella 
2218 – Syncopacma adversa 
2219 – Syncopacma crotalariella 
2220 – Syncopacma metadesma 
2221 – Syncopacma nigrella 
2222 – Syncopacma palpilineella 
2223 – Untomia albistrigella 
2224 – Untomia untomiella 
2225 – Battaristis concinusella 
2226 – Battaristis cyclella 
2227 – Battaristis nigratomella 
2228 – Battaristis pasadenae 
2229 – Battaristis vittella, stripe-backed moth
2230 – Anacampsis agrimoniella 
2231 – Anacampsis argyrothamniella 
2232 – Anacampsis comparanda 
2233 – Anacampsis conclusella 
2234 – Anacampsis coverdalella, Coverdale's anacampsis moth
2235 – Anacampsis fragariella 
2236 – Anacampsis fullonella 
2237 – Anacampsis innocuella, dark-headed aspen leafroller moth
2238 – Anacampsis kearfottella 
2239 – Anacampsis lacteusochrella 
2240 – Anacampsis lagunculariella 
2241 – Anacampsis levipedella 
2242 – Anacampsis lupinella 
2243 – Anacampsis niveopulvella, pale-headed aspen leafroller moth
2244 – Anacampsis nonstrigella 
2245 – Anacampsis paltodoriella 
2246 – Anacampsis populella, sallow leafroller moth
2247 – Anacampsis psoraliella 
2248 – Anacampsis rhoifructella
no number yet – Anacampsis consonella 
2249 – Anacampsis sacramenta 
2250 – Anacampsis tephriasella 
2251 – Anacampsis tristrigella 
2252 – Compsolechia crescentifasciella 
2253 – Strobisia iridipennella, iridescent strobisia moth
2254 – Strobisia proserpinella 
2255 – Holophysis emblemella 
2256 – Prostomeus brunneus, guava caterpillar moth
2257 – Anarsia lineatella, peach twig borer moth
2258 – Hypatima zesticopa 
2259 – Epilechia catalinella 
2260 – Sitotroga cerealella, angoumois grain moth
2261 – Pectinophora gossypiella, pink bollworm moth
2262 – Platyedra subcinerea, cotton stem moth
2263 – Helcystogramma badia 
2264 – Helcystogramma casca 
2265 – Helcystogramma chambersella 
2265.1 – Helcystogramma convolvuli, sweetpotato webworm moth
2266 – Gelechia discoannulella 
2267 – Helcystogramma fernaldella, Fernald's helcystogramma moth
2268 – Helcystogramma hystricella, lanceolate helcystogramma moth
2269 – Helcystogramma melanocarpa 
2270 – Helcystogramma melantherella 
2271.1 – Helcystogramma ectopon 
2272 – Brachyacma palpigera, soybean webworm moth
2274 – Dichomeris bipunctella 
2275 – Dichomeris condaliavorella 
2275.1 – Dichomeris blanchardorum 
2276 – Scodes deflecta 
2277 – Dichomeris georgiella 
2278 – Dichomeris glenni 
2279 – Dichomeris hirculella 
2279.1 – Dichomeris caia 
2279.2 – Dichomeris ardelia 
2279.3 – Dichomeris siren, least dichomeris moth
2280 – Dichomeris hypochloa 
2281 – Dichomeris ligulella, palmerworm moth
2281.1 – Dichomeris gausapa 
2282 – Dichomeris marginella, juniper webworm moth
2282.1 – Dichomeris solatrix 
2283 – Dichomeris punctidiscella, spotted dichomeris moth
2284 – Dichomeris acuminata 
2284.1 – Dichomeris nenia 
2285.1 – Dichomeris diva 
2285.2 – Dichomeris sylphe 
2285.3 – Dichomeris empusa 
2286 – Dichomeris vacciniella 
2287 – Dichomeris ventrella 
2288 – Dichomeris punctipennella, many-spotted dichomeris moth
2289 – Dichomeris ochripalpella, shining dichomeris moth
2289.1 – Dichomeris achne 
2290 – Dichomeris barnesiella 
2291 – Dichomeris bilobella, bilobed dichomeris moth
2291.1 – Dichomeris aleatrix, buffy dichomeris moth
2291.2 – Dichomeris copa, copa dichomeris moth
2291.3 – Dichomeris scrutaria 
2291.4 – Dichomeris furia 
2292 – Dichomeris citrifoliella, orange webworm moth
2293 – Dichomeris costarufoella 
2294 – Dichomeris delotella 
2294.1 – Dichomeris gleba 
2294.2 – Dichomeris alphito 
2294.3 – Dichomeris laetitia 
2295 – Dichomeris flavocostella, cream-edged dichomeris moth
2295.1 – Dichomeris fistuca 
2296 – Gelechia griseella 
2297 – Dichomeris inserrata, indented dichomeris moth
2297.1 – Dichomeris pelta 
2297.2 – Dichomeris bolize, Glaser's dichomeris moth
2297.3 – Dichomeris legnotoa 
2297.4 – Dichomeris illusio 
2297.5 – Dichomeris mimesis 
2298 – Dichomeris juncidella 
2299 – Dichomeris leuconotella 
2299.1 – Dichomeris mercatrix 
2299.2 – Dichomeris euprepes 
2300 – Dichomeris levisella 
2301 – Dichomeris serrativittella 
2301.1 – Dichomeris xanthoa 
2301.2 – Dichomeris isa 
2301.3 – Dichomeris simulata 
2301.4 – Dichomeris imitata 
2302 – Dichomeris setosella 
2302.1 – Dichomeris vindex 
2302.2 – Dichomeris mulsa 
2302.3 – Dichomeris mica 
2302.4 – Dichomeris aglaia 
2303 – Dichomeris simpliciella 
2303.1 – Dichomeris baxa 
2303.2 – Dichomeris gnoma 
2304 – Dichomeris stipendiaria 
2305 – Dichomeris agonia 
2305.1 – Dichomeris offula 
2305.2 – Dichomeris crepida 
2306 – Dichomeris washingtoniella 
2307 – Dichomeris nonstrigella 
2308 – Dichomeris purpureofusca 
2309 – Dichomeris picrocarpa, black-edged carbatina moth
2309.1 – Dichomeris sybilla 
2310 – Dichomeris inversella
2310.1 – Dichomeris kimballi 
2311 – Deoclona yuccasella

See also
List of butterflies of North America
List of Lepidoptera of Hawaii
List of moths of Canada
List of butterflies of Canada

External links
Checklists of North American Moths

Moths of North America
North America